The 2014–15 A-League was the 38th season of top-flight soccer in Australia, and the 10th season of the A-League since its establishment in 2004. Brisbane Roar were both the defending A-League Premiers and Champions. The regular season commenced on 10 October 2014 and concluded on 26 April 2015. The 2015 Grand Final took place on 17 May 2015. The season was suspended from 9–24 January in order to avoid a clash with the 2015 AFC Asian Cup, which was hosted by Australia.

The 2015 Grand Final took place on 17 May 2015, with Melbourne Victory claiming their third Championship with a 3–0 win against Sydney FC.

The season marked the first year that the team formerly known as Melbourne Heart competed as Melbourne City after the club's renaming in June 2014.

Clubs

Personnel and kits

Transfers

Managerial changes

Foreign players
 
The following do not fill a Visa position:
1Those players who were born and started their professional career abroad but have since gained Australian citizenship (and New Zealand citizenship, in the case of Wellington Phoenix);
2Australian citizens (and New Zealand citizens, in the case of Wellington Phoenix) who have chosen to represent another national team;
3Injury Replacement Players, or National Team Replacement Players;
4Guest Players (eligible to play a maximum of ten games)

Salary cap exemptions and captains

Regular season

League table

Results

Finals series

Elimination-finals

Semi-finals

Grand Final

Statistics

Top goalscorers

Own goals

Hat-tricks

 Player came on as substitute.

Clean sheets

NB - Additional clean sheets were kept by Adelaide United and Melbourne Victory, however these are not listed due to goalkeeper substitutions.

Attendances

By club
These are the attendance records of each of the teams at the end of the home and away season. The table does not include finals series attendances.

By round

Top 10 season attendances

Club membership

Awards

End-of-season awards
The following end of the season awards were announced at the Hyundai A-League & Westfield W-League 2014–15 Awards night held at the Carriageworks in Sydney on 11 May 2015.
 Johnny Warren Medal – Nathan Burns, Wellington Phoenix
 NAB Young Footballer of the Year – James Jeggo, Adelaide United
 Nike Golden Boot Award – Marc Janko, Sydney FC (16 goals)
 Goalkeeper of the Year – Eugene Galekovic, Adelaide United
 Manager of the Year – Kevin Muscat, Melbourne Victory
 Fair Play Award – Wellington Phoenix
 Referee of the Year – Jarred Gillett
 Goal of the Year – Tarek Elrich, Adelaide United (Adelaide United v Melbourne City, 25 April 2015)
 Joe Marston Medal – Mark Milligan

See also

 2014–15 Adelaide United FC season
 2014–15 Brisbane Roar FC season
 2014–15 Central Coast Mariners FC season
 2014–15 Melbourne City FC season
 2014–15 Melbourne Victory FC season
 2014–15 Newcastle Jets FC season
 2014–15 Perth Glory FC season
 2014–15 Sydney FC season
 2014–15 Wellington Phoenix FC season
 2014–15 Western Sydney Wanderers FC season

Notes

References

 
A-League Men seasons
A League
1
1